Vaidavere is a village in Jõgeva Parish, Jõgeva County in eastern Estonia.

References

Villages in Jõgeva County